Chinese people in Angola are a recent group of residents, having arrived in Angola in the past few decades.

Thousands of Chinese construction workers, engineers, planners, and support staff that includes doctors and cooks reside in Angola, making the construction sector a large magnet for Chinese. 

Over 500 Chinese companies have operated in Angola, as part of post-war reconstruction. The height of the wave was around 2012 when Angola's Office of Migration and Foreigners, stated 258,920 Chinese resided in Angola, the vast majority (258,391) on work visas. According to a retrospective estimate from the South China Morning Post, the Chinese population in Angola peaked at 300,000.

The level of the Chinese population since the crash in oil prices in 2014 has fallen dramatically. In 2017, a Chinese business association leader told Bloomberg that the population was approximately 50,000. Many Chinese have left the country recently because of rising crime against Chinese, including rapes, robberies and murder, the depreciation of Angolan currency due to the oil crash, and halting of construction contracts by Chinese companies. 

During a large outbreak of yellow fever in Angola in the spring of 2016, eleven Chinese nationals were reported to have traveled home to China with the disease, with the last case in April 2016. The Chinese strengthened surveillance and sent a medical team to Angola to provide vaccination to Chinese nationals.

By 2022, the population was estimated to be down to 20,000, following a multi-year contraction of Angola's economy as well as changes to Angola–China relations during the presidency of Joao Lourenco.

References

Angola
Ethnic groups in Angola
ḥ